Syngnathus dawsoni is a species of the pipefishes. It occurs in the central, western Atlantic in the Caribbean Sea from Puerto Rico to St. Lucia and has been recorded only from the east of the Mona Passage. It is a marine tropical demersal fish. It is ovoviviparous; the male carries the fertilized eggs in a brood pouch located under his tail. The specific name honours Charles Eric Dawson who collected the type material and who recognised this species as different from the other Atlantic members of the family Syngnathidae.

References

Tropical fish
dawsoni
Fish of North America
Fish of the United States
Fish of the Atlantic Ocean
Fish described in 1969